Harrison Grant Holmes (born March 22, 1996) is an American professional baseball pitcher in the Atlanta Braves organization. He was drafted by the Los Angeles Dodgers in the first round of the 2014 Major League Baseball draft.

Career
Holmes attended Conway High School in Conway, South Carolina. He was considered one of the top prospects for the 2014 Major League Baseball Draft. He had committed to the University of Florida, but he was drafted by the Los Angeles Dodgers as the 22nd pick in the first round of the draft.

Los Angeles Dodgers
Holmes was officially signed by the Dodgers on June 17, 2014 for $2.5 million. The Dodgers assigned him to the Arizona League Dodgers to begin his professional career. He was 1–2 with a 3.00 ERA in seven appearances for them, before he was promoted, on August 14, 2014, to the Ogden Raptors. In four starts for Ogden, he was 1-1 with a 4.91 ERA. Holmes was assigned to the Great Lakes Loons to start the 2015 season. He was selected to the mid-season All-Star team. He finished the season with a 6–4 record and 3.14 ERA in 24 starts. Holmes was promoted to the Rancho Cucamonga Quakes to start the 2016 season.

Oakland Athletics
On August 1, 2016, the Dodgers traded Holmes, Jharel Cotton, and Frankie Montas to the Oakland Athletics in exchange for Rich Hill and Josh Reddick. Oakland assigned Holmes to the Stockton Ports, where he finished the season; in 26 total games (23 starts) between Rancho Cucamonga and Stockton, he posted a combined 11–7 record and 4.63 ERA. Holmes spent 2017 with the Midland RockHounds, pitching to an 11–12 record and 4.49 ERA with 150 strikeouts in  innings pitched.

The Athletics added Holmes to their 40-man roster after the 2018 season. Holmes missed over a month during the year with shoulder soreness, and split the 2019 season between Midland and the Las Vegas Aviators, going a combined 6–5 with a 3.23 ERA and 81 strikeouts over  innings. Holmes did not play in a game in 2020 due to the cancellation of the minor league season because of the COVID-19 pandemic. In 2021, Holmes played for Triple-A Las Vegas, and pitched to a 8.01 ERA in 36 appearances for the team. On April 1, 2022, the Athletics sent Holmes outright to Las Vegas, removing him from their 40-man roster. He was released on July 28, 2022.

Atlanta Braves
On August 13, 2022, Holmes signed a minor league deal with the Atlanta Braves.

Personal life
Holmes' brother, Colby Holmes, played college baseball at the University of South Carolina and currently plays in the Atlanta Braves organization.

Holmes and his wife, Sami, married in February 2020.

References

External links

1996 births
Living people
People from Conway, South Carolina
Baseball players from South Carolina
Baseball pitchers
Arizona League Dodgers players
Ogden Raptors players
Great Lakes Loons players
Rancho Cucamonga Quakes players
Stockton Ports players
Midland RockHounds players
Las Vegas Aviators players